Azanus isis, the white-banded babul blue, is a butterfly in the family Lycaenidae which is native to the tropics and subtropics of sub-Saharan Africa.

Range and habitat

It is found in Senegal, Guinea-Bissau, Guinea, Sierra Leone, Liberia, Ivory Coast, Ghana, Togo, southern Nigeria, Cameroon, the Republic of the Congo, Angola, the DRC, Uganda, Ethiopia, north-western Tanzania and northern Zambia. The habitat consists of forest edges and clearings, woodland and moist savanna.

Habits and food plants
Adult males mud-puddle, visit carcasses and excrement and settle on sweaty clothing and skin. They are attracted to traps baited with rotting shrimp. The larvae feed on Dichrostachys cinerea africana and Dichrostachys glomerata.

References

Butterflies described in 1773
Azanus
Butterflies of Africa
Taxa named by Dru Drury